Airports of Peru is a private company that operates twelve regional airports in Peru. It is the first group of regional airports the government of Peru transferred to a private operator. The company was incorporated on October 30, 2006.

History 
In 2013, AdP invested US$112 million in the renovation of the runways of three airports: Chiclayo, Piura y Talara.

Activity 
In December 2014, AdP was 100% acquired by Talma, a Peruvian airport services company that belongs to the Sandoval group and Enfoca Inversiones.

AdP's partners comprise Swissport GBH Perú, an air cargo warehousing, ramp services, and maintenance company in the Jorge Chávez International Airport area, and GBH Investments, the holding of Swissport GBH group that brings expertise in infrastructure project management.

AdP is being advised by the ANA Aeroportos de Portugal, providing know-how, experience and expertise in airports management to Aeropuertos del Perú. ANA operates six regional airports in Portugal: Flores, Horta, Ponta Delgada, Santa María, Lisbon and Faro.

Airports operated by AdP

The following airports are operated by Aeropuertos del Perú (AdP). All but one (in Pisco) are located in Northern Peru.

References

See also

Related articles 

 Lima Airport Partners
 Jorge Chávez International Airport
 CORPAC

External links
 Official website

Airport operators
Transport companies of Peru
!Aeropuertos del Peru